Jinshaia sinensis is a species of loach endemic to the Yangtze and the Jinsha Jiang drainages of China.

References

Balitoridae
Fish of Asia
Freshwater fish of China
Fish described in 1874